The Royal Shrewsbury Hospital is a teaching hospital in Shrewsbury, Shropshire, England. It forms the Shrewsbury site of the Shrewsbury and Telford Hospital NHS Trust, serving patients from Shropshire (including Telford and Wrekin) and Powys, in conjunction with the Princess Royal Hospital in Telford.

History
The hospital, which was built to replace the Royal Salop Infirmary in the centre of Shrewsbury and the Copthorne Hospital on the opposite side of the Mytton Oak Road, was opened by the Prince of Wales in 1979. Expansion of the hospital took place when services were transferred from the Ear, Nose and Throat Hospital in the centre of Shrewsbury in 1998.

The site on the opposite side of the Mytton Oak Road, formerly occupied by the Copthorne Hospital, was deemed surplus to requirements and sold to Crest Nicholson to create affordable housing in November 2007. Called Copthorne Grange, two of its roads, Seacole Way and Cavell Drive were named after famous wartime nurses.

Notable patients
Those reported to have died there include:
William Alonzo Parker - former Anglican Bishop of Shrewsbury (1982)
David Ormsby-Gore, 5th Baron Harlech - Conservative politician and former Ambassador to the United States (1985, after car crash).
Bertram ('Jimmy') James - former Royal Air Force officer and Great Escape survivor (2008)
Pete Postlethwaite - actor (2011)
Geoff Morris - retired professional footballer, notably Walsall and Shrewsbury Town (2015).
Guy N. Smith - writer (2020)

See also
Princess Royal Hospital, Telford - the other site of the Shrewsbury and Telford Hospital NHS Trust
List of hospitals in England

References

External links

 
 Royal Shrewsbury Hospital on the NHS website
 Inspection reports from the Care Quality Commission

Buildings and structures in Shrewsbury
Hospitals in Shropshire
NHS hospitals in England
Teaching hospitals in England